Mbam-et-Kim is a department of Centre Region in Cameroon. The department covers an area of 25,906 km and as of 2001 had a total population of 64,540. The capital of the department lies at Ntui.

Subdivisions
The department is divided administratively into five communes and in turn into villages.

Communes 
 Mbangassina
 Ngambè-Tikar 
 Ngoro
 Ntui
 Yoko

References

Departments of Cameroon
Centre Region (Cameroon)